Inema Arts Center is an arts center and art gallery located in Kigali, the capital city of Rwanda.

The center was founded in 2012 by two painters: Innocent Nkurunziza and Emmanuel Nkuranga. The two painters and siblings started Inema Arts Center with the goal of showcasing Rwanda's latent artistic skills, using creative expression to bring the community and country to life, and providing a platform for Rwandan artists.

Inema Art Gallery
Inema Arts Center has evolved into a platform for various artists who communicate through creative expression. Several Rwandan creative artists make up the Inema Arts Center. Inema Arts Center currently has slots for ten resident artists to realize their creative potential. The specialities at Inema are music, dance, African contemporary arts, and crafts.

The Inema Art Gallery features portraits, sculptures, and other artistic objects created and shown by Inema artists. The center also conducts a variety of projects and activities aimed at promoting Rwanda's creative arts and offering a forum for creative expression through workshops, training, and practical instruction.

References

External links
 Inema Arts Center website

2012 establishments in Rwanda
Organizations established in 2012
Arts centres
Arts organisations based in Rwanda
Organisations based in Kigali
Buildings and structures in Kigali